Botkins High School is a public high school in Botkins, Ohio.  It is the only high school in the Botkins Local Schools district. The school serves grades 7–12.
The Trojans wear black, gold, and white and compete in the Shelby County Athletic League.

Kent Boyd, a Top 2 finalist on So You Think You Can Dance, graduated from Botkins High School in 2010.  BHS is part of Botkins Local School, which serves grades K-12. Botkins Local School is a top 20 best public school in Ohio. Botkins recently moved their school from 208 North Sycamore to 404 East State Street as of 2014.

Sports
OHSAA State Championships
 Boys Basketball - 2021

References

External links
 Botkins Local School

High schools in Shelby County, Ohio
Public high schools in Ohio
Public middle schools in Ohio